Ankathatti is a village in the state of Karnataka, India, situated 15 km away from Kolar. The village has a population of about 900, with 300 houses. It is devoid of huts, with proper housing for all the inhabitants. Ankathatti is known for its religious culture, having a  height Uthsava Murti, as well as its high production of silk and milk.

References

Villages in Kolar district